John C. Bliss was an American educator and college administrator. He was educated at Cornell University with an A.B. in 1889. He served as president of what is now State University of New York at New Paltz from 1908 to 1923.

References

Cornell University alumni
State University of New York at New Paltz faculty
Presidents of campuses of the State University of New York
Year of birth missing
Year of death missing